Municipal election for Kalaiya took place on 13 May 2022, with all 137 positions up for election across 27 wards. The electorate elected a mayor, a deputy mayor, 27 ward chairs and 108 ward members. An indirect election will also be held to elect five female members and an additional three female members from the Dalit and minority community to the municipal executive.

Binod Prasad Shah from CPN (Unified Marxist–Leninist) was elected as mayor but no party was able to gain a majority in the council.

Background 

Kalaiya was established in 1982 as a municipality. The sub-metropolitan city was created in 2017 by merging neighboring village development committees into Kalaiya. Electors in each ward elect a ward chair and four ward members, out of which two must be female and one of the two must belong to the Dalit community.

In the previous election, Rajesh Rae Yadav from Nepali Congress was elected as the first mayor of the sub-metropolitan city.

Candidates

Results

Mayoral election

Ward results 

|-
! colspan="2" style="text-align:centre;" | Party
! Chairman
! Members
|-
| style="background-color:;" |
| style="text-align:left;" |Nepali Congress
| style="text-align:center;" | 10
| style="text-align:center;" | 33
|-
| style="background-color:;" |
| style="text-align:left;" |CPN (Unified Marxist-Leninist)
| style="text-align:center;" | 9
| style="text-align:center;" | 46
|-
| style="background-color:;" |
| style="text-align:left;" |People's Socialist Party, Nepal
| style="text-align:center;" | 6
| style="text-align:center;" | 22
|-
| style="background-color:cyan;" |
| style="text-align:left;" |Nepal Loktantrik Party
| style="text-align:center;" | 1
| style="text-align:center;" | 4
|-
| style="background-color:;" |
| style="text-align:left;" |CPN (Unified Socialist)
| style="text-align:center;" | 1
| style="text-align:center;" | 3
|-
! colspan="2" style="text-align:right;" | Total
! 27
! 108
|}

Summary of results by ward

See also 

 2022 Nepalese local elections
 2022 Lalitpur municipal election
 2022 Kathmandu municipal election
 2022 Janakpur municipal election
 2022 Pokhara municipal election
 2022 Provincial Assembly of Madhesh Province election

References

Kalaiya